Yuri Abramoviсh Levitin (Yuriy, Youri; Levitine) (Russian language:   Юрий Абра́мович Левитин) ( – 26 July 1993 in Moscow)  was a Soviet Russian composer of classical music.

Early life
Levitin was born in Poltava.  In 1935 he finished his studies at Leningrad Conservatory. In 1937, Graduate study in piano. He finished conservatory with composition classes under Dmitri Shostakovich.

He worked as pianist in the Leningrad State stage and the Leningrad Philharmonic Society (1931-1941). After this he managed the musical portion of the theater in Tashkent (1941-1942). From 1942 he lived and worked in Moscow.

Compositions

His output includes four operas; seven cantatas; two symphonies; concertos for orchestra, and for solo instruments and orchestra including trumpet, clarinet, cello, oboe and horn; chamber- instrument ensembles, including about a dozen string quartets; many songs; and music for films.

References

External links

1912 births
1993 deaths
Musicians from Poltava
Russian male classical composers
Soviet film score composers
Male film score composers
20th-century classical composers
People's Artists of the RSFSR
Stalin Prize winners
Saint Petersburg Conservatory alumni
20th-century Russian male musicians